A Kiss Before Dying is a 1956 American color film noir, directed by Gerd Oswald in his directorial debut. The screenplay was written by Lawrence Roman, based on Ira Levin's 1953 novel of the same name, which won the 1954 Edgar Award for Best First Novel. The drama stars Robert Wagner, Jeffrey Hunter, Virginia Leith, Joanne Woodward, and Mary Astor. It was remade in 1991 under the same title.

Wagner plays a charming, intelligent man who will stop at nothing to get his life where he wants it to go. His problem is a pregnant womanplayed by Woodward in one of her first film roleswho loves him. The solution involves desperate measures.

Plot
In 1956, Bud Corliss is an ambitious University student who is wooing fellow student Dorothy Kingship purely for her father's mining fortune. When he discovers that Dorothy is pregnant with his child, he realizes she is quite likely to be disinherited by her father, Leo Kingship. She does not care about this, saying she feels "like me" for the first time in her life, free of her father's control. Bud assures Dorothy that he will take care of her, hesitates when Dorothy insists on getting married, but then seemingly agrees to it.

After she experiences a fall on some bleachers, Bud spends the days leading up to their wedding formulating an elaborate plan to make it appear that she has committed suicide. He is stunned into near panic when this fails. On the day they are to be married, Bud purposely has Dorothy meet him at the Municipal Building during the lunch hour when the registry office is closed. He suggests they go to the roof for some air. There, he manipulates her into position and pushes her off the  building; her death is considered a suicide because of a letter he had forged and mailed to her sister in anticipation of his original plan working.

After a couple of months, Dorothy's sister, Ellen, is dating Bud; he is trying once again to ingratiate himself with Leo Kingship. Ellen has no idea of Bud's previous relationship with Dorothy; she has, however, always had doubts about her sister's suicide. She has an idea that if she can find out who her sister's boyfriend was, he might be her killer. For help, Ellen contacts Gordon Gant, who tutored Dorothy. Shortly, Ellen believes she has identified the boyfriend, Dwight Powell. Bud learns of the investigation and manages to eliminate Powell from the equation. This, too, is taken to be a suicide.

Ellen is satisfied that Powell was the man who killed Dorothy. She and Bud become engaged. Gordon shows up during the engagement party to tell her that he has discovered that Powell could not have committed the crime. On his way out, he is introduced to Bud; while driving home, he stops at a phone booth to call his uncle, the Chief of Police, to reveal that he believes he had seen Bud with Dorothy at the University. Gordon returns to Ellen's and informs Leo Kingship that he is certain Bud was dating Dorothy and is likely her murderer. They give Ellen this news, which she rejects outright.

The next morning, the couple drive to the Kingship mine so Bud can see the family fortune being made. Meanwhile, Gordon's uncle confirms that Bud was Dorothy's boyfriend.

During casual conversation, Bud lets it slip both that he knows more about the smelter than he should, considering he supposedly has been only talking with Ellen about her family, and that – concurrent with Dorothy – he had frequently gone to concerts in the University town. He admits to Ellen that he knew her sister, and that he "even had a few dates with her". He tries to tell Ellen that he was being considerate of her emotions by keeping it a secret; they argue and Bud stalks to the edge of the open mine pit. Ellen goes after him, still hoping he is not a murderer. They continue to talk and he refers to Dorothy as "Dorrie", a name only he called her, it becomes obvious that he, indeed, is guilty. Her father and Gordon arrive and witness Bud struggling to throw Ellen into the pit; in a desperate attempt to kill her, Bud shoves her in front of an oncoming truck, but to his shock, the truck swerves and instead hits Bud, knocking him over the cliff to his death, while Ellen is safe.

Cast
 Robert Wagner as Bud Corliss
 Jeffrey Hunter as Gordon Grant
 Virginia Leith as Ellen Kingship
 Joanne Woodward as Dorothy Kingship
 Mary Astor as Mrs. Corliss
 George Macready as Leo Kingship
 Robert Quarry as Dwight Powell
 Howard Petrie as Howard Chesser, chief of police
 Molly McCart as Annabelle Koch

Cast notes:
 A Kiss Before Dying was the second film Robert Wagner made in 1956 in which he played against his usual clean-cut image, after The Mountain, with Spencer Tracy.
 This was Mary Astor's first film since 1949 when she made Any Number Can Play.
 A Kiss Before Dying was Joanne Woodward's second film, after Count Three and Pray, the year before. She said at one time that it was her "worst picture".

Production
Darryl F. Zanuck bought the rights to the book in August 1953, following the bidding of many studios. His public announcement revealed that Wagner would star in the lead. The role of Dwight Powell, played in the film by Robert Quarry, was initially to be played by Martin Milner, but Milner had to drop out because of schedule changes.

In 1955, it was announced the film would be made by Crown Productions and distributed by United Artists. It was the second film from Crown following The Killer Is Loose; an executive for the company was Robert Jacks, Daryl Zanuck's son-in-law.

Three members of the cast – Wagner, Joanne Woodward and Jeffrey Hunter – were loaned to United Artists by Twentieth Century-Fox.  The film was the directorial debut of Gerd Oswald, and was filmed in Tucson, Arizona.

The film's use of the word "pregnant" caused controversy: it was cut during its preview in Chicago, and United Artists was not allowed by the Hollywood censors to use the word in any advertising.

Critical reception

Contemporaneous response
When the film opened, the review in Variety commented: "This multiple-murder story is an offbeat sort of film, with Robert Wagner portraying a calculating youth who intends to allow nothing to stand in his way to money ... Gerd Oswald's restrained direction suits the mood ... Wagner registers in killer role. Woodward is particularly good as the pregnant girl, and Virginia Leith acceptable as her sister. Jeffrey Hunter is lost as a part-time university professor responsible for the final solution of the crimes. Mary Astor and George Macready are okay as Wagner's mother and the girls' father."

Modern assessment
Time Out Film Guide liked the script and the direction of the film, and wrote, "An early Ira Levin thriller, predating Rosemary's Baby...superbly adapted as an icily acute nightmare...by the great Oswald, giving a criminally myopic Hollywood its first glimpse of a unique visual talent, idiosyncratically developed from that of his father, German silent director Richard Oswald."

Film critic James Crawford praised the film for direction and inventiveness.  He makes the case that the film's long second shot functions as a foreshadowing, an organizing principle, a statement of purpose in the film.  Crawford wrote, "It’s not remarkable for what it revealsit’s essentially exposition of narrative and character traitsbut for its movement, length, and the way it approaches space, viewer identification, and power dynamics." As for the creativity of the film, he compares the three minutes, 26 seconds length of the shot and likened it to the "granddaddy of all tracking shots," the one that kicks off Touch of Evilthe most apropos comparison, given that it was released in 1958, two years later.

Noir analysis
According to film critic Alain Silver, a theme used in film noir is the disruptive force of the "maniac" in society. The threat to the family and social values is apparent in these types of films. Gaining dominance and disrupting the family is a central theme of A Kiss Before Dying. Robert Wagner's character pursues one path to his true target in Dorothy, then kills her and pursues her sister, all with the objective of reaching their father and his fortune.

Remake
An adaptation directed by James Dearden was made in 1991 using the same title. Called "insanely inept" and "bereft of suspense" by Entertainment Weekly, the film earned two Razzie awards. The movie was unofficially remade in Malayalam as Moonilonnu (1996), and in Hindi as Baazigar (1993) starring Shah Rukh Khan.

See also
List of American films of 1956

References

External links

 
 
 
 
 

1956 films
1950s psychological thriller films
American psychological thriller films
1950s English-language films
Color film noir
Films based on American novels
Films based on thriller novels
Films based on works by Ira Levin
1956 directorial debut films
United Artists films
Films directed by Gerd Oswald
Films scored by Lionel Newman
American pregnancy films
Films shot in Tucson, Arizona
1950s pregnancy films
CinemaScope films
1950s American films